Pamela Rae Huteson (born 1957) is an Alaska Native author and illustrator, from Prince of Wales Island in Southeast Alaska. She is both Tlingit and Haida, of the Shungkweidi Eagle moiety, from the Wolf House.

Part Owner & DJ of the on-line ThunderCloud Radio, Home of the Hu-Haa Hitz. Featuring Native Hip Hop, Native R&B, & Native Reggae from Hawaii to Greenland.

She has collaborated with her son to produce a Tlingit culture app, Totem Stories, based on her book.

Poetry
 Legends in Wood, Stories of the Totems (Tigard, Or: Greatland Classic Sales, 2002  )

Publications containing Huteson's illustrations
 Legends in Wood, Stories of the Totems (Tigard, Or: Greatland Classic Sales, 2002  )
 Coloring Alaska, the Greatland on a Summers Day (Tigard, Or: Greatland Classic Sales, 2004)
 Transformation Masks (Hancock House Publications, 2007  )

Other publications containing her entries
 Encyclopedia of Anthropology. 2006. Entries: Aleut, Athabascan, Kwakiutl, Tlingit, Haida, Eskimo Acculturation, Potlatch, Feasts and Festivals. SAGE Publications
 Encyclopedia of Race, Ethnicity & Society. 2008. Entries: Aleut, Tlingit, Indigenous Canada, Alaska Native Legislations. SAGE Publications
 Encyclopedia of Time. 2009. Entries: Totems, Myths of Creation, Tribal Calendars, Chaco Canyon, Pueblo. SAGE Publications
 21st Century Anthropology; A Reference Handbook. 2010. Entry: Inuit. SAGE Publications

References

External links
 Transformation Masks - Hancock House Publication
Transformation Masks - Book Description - Amazon-UK
Encyclopedia of Anthropology - Sage Publications, Inc.
Encyclopedia of Race, Ethnicity, and Society - Sage Publications, Inc.
Encyclopedia of Time - Sage Publications, Inc.
21st Century Anthropology - Sage Publications, Inc.
Legends in Wood, Stories of the Totems - Greatland Classic Sales
ThunderCloud Radio pre-released in National Native Month on ShoutCast, on 11-14-09 4pm Pacific time and is streaming online now -  Hip Hop Press
ThunderCloud Radio - Home of the Hu-Haa Hitz

1957 births
Living people
21st-century American poets
21st-century Native Americans
Alaska Native people
Haida people
Tlingit people